The Tamaki by-election 1992 was a by-election held in the  electorate during the 43rd New Zealand Parliament, on 15 February 1992. It was caused by the resignation of incumbent MP Sir Robert Muldoon and was won by Clem Simich with a majority of 1,252. The by-election was also notable as the first contested by the recently formed Alliance Party, and for their success in coming second ahead of the Labour Party.

Background
Sir Robert Muldoon had held the seat of Tamaki since 1960. Following National's win at the 1990 election Prime Minister Jim Bolger did not appoint Muldoon to a cabinet posting and he quickly became dissatisfied with his backbench role. Following the Mother of all Budgets in 1991, which marked a radical turn to the right in economic policy, Muldoon felt that National had moved too far from its position under his leadership. These factors combined to lead him to resign from parliament and quit politics altogether.

Candidates
Alliance
The newly formed Alliance, a coalition of several minor parties, sought to carry on its momentum after winning two by-elections for the Auckland Regional Council. The Democrat Party, Green Party, Mana Motuhake and NewLabour Party cooperated and stood joint candidates which saw them secure victories.

Four candidates from three of the component parties sought the Alliance nomination.

Neville Aitchison, a consultant and activist from the Democrat Party
Richard Green, the Green Party candidate from the 1990 election
Laila Harré, a former ministerial advisor from the NewLabour Party

Leitch was selected after winning an electoral college of members in the Tamaki electorate.

Labour
There were four candidates for the Labour Party nomination.

Peter Kaiser, deputy principal of Ranui School and West Auckland representative on Labour's New Zealand Council
Deborah Shuttleworth, a property developer and committee member for the  electorate
Verna Smith, an executive for the Royal New Zealand Foundation of the Blind and a party organiser
Shane Te Pou, an organiser for the Service Workers' Union and South Auckland representative on Labour's New Zealand Council

Smith was selected. She had joined Labour in 1987 having previously been an organiser for the British Labour Party.

National
David Kirk, a former All Blacks captain and Rhodes Scholar who had just returned from Oxford, launched a high-profile bid for the seat. He had the support of the National Party head office and endorsement from Bolger. The other main candidate was National's Tamaki electorate chairman Clem Simich, a former policeman, who was backed by Muldoon. Janie Pearce, the former deputy leader of the New Zealand Party who had just joined National in 1991, also launched a campaign for the seat.

The 19 nominees were narrowed to a shortlist of five candidates which went to a selection meeting ballot. The candidates were:

Ron Greer, a former Auckland City Councillor for the Eastern Bays Ward
David Kirk, a management consultant and ex-All Blacks captain
Jennie Langley, a former member of National's dominion council

Simich won the selection, gaining a majority on the third ballot among the 84 local delegates. Kirk was runner-up and Langley was third. Eardley-Wilmot and Greer had been eliminated already. Simich had a far better connection to the electorate than Kirk which led to his victory.

Others
The Christian Heritage Party selected Printing, Packaging and Manufacturing Union organiser Clive Thomson to contest the seat. The New Zealand Defence Movement, an anti-immigration party, selected Auckland lawyer Bevan Skelton as its candidate. Former Rugby League player Dean Lonergan stood as an independent candidate as part of a publicity stunt for Radio Hauraki. Cliff Emeny (former leader of the Country Party) stood as an independent candidate. Tania Harris, who had organised a large protest march against trade union strike action the previous year, stood under the banner of her newly-formed United New Zealand party (unrelated to the United New Zealand formed three years later).

Polling
Three polls were conducted.

Previous election

Results
The following table gives the election results:

1 Alliance vote increase over 3,556 combined vote for Green Party, New Labour and Democrats in 1990 election.
2 Based on 1990 election figures.

Aftermath
Simich served as MP for Tamaki until 2005 when he became a List MP before retiring from parliament in 2008. The National Party celebrated their win at a local Auckland yacht club. Labour Party deputy leader Helen Clark was a surprise attendee and was seen sipping chardonnay with Simich's campaign manager Ross Armstrong in a back room, rather than at her own Labour headquarters. Both National and Labour were relieved that their then common enemy, the Alliance, had been beaten.

References

Tamaki 1992
1992 elections in New Zealand
Politics of the Auckland Region
February 1992 events in New Zealand